Muley Point refers to:

Places in Utah
Muley Point (Iron County, Utah), a cliff.
Muley Point (San Juan County, Utah), a cliff and overlook.